The Vickers Vigilant was a British 1960s era MCLOS wire-guided anti-tank missile used by the British Army. It was also licence-built in the United States by Clevite for the US Marine Corps, and sometimes known as Clevite rounds in this case.

Development began at Vickers-Armstrongs' in 1956 as a private project in order to prevent the company's Weybridge Guided Missile Department having nothing to do after the cancellation of Red Dean. By 1960 it had completed development and an extensive testing program, but the War Office remained disinterested as they wished for the Department to be disbanded as part of the ongoing formation of British Aircraft Corporation. On several occasions the Office explicitly stated they did not want to provide any encouragement to the team as this might make it harder to close the division down in the future.

After considerable debate spanning several years, the project eventually won an initial order as it was the only suitable design to quickly arm the Ferret armoured car. By this time the War Office had already decided that their ultimate weapon for this role would be the Swingfire. An order for several thousand Vigilant was placed late in 1961 as an "interim weapon" whilst awaiting Swingfire. The order immediately resulted in several additional orders from Kuwait, Saudi Arabia, Libya and Abu Dhabi, along with Vigilant-armed Ferret sales to the UAE and Yemen. The order also sealed the US decision to license Vigilant for local production.

Swingfire did not arrive until 1969, and during that time the medium-range man portable version had been dropped. This left the Vigilant in use with the infantry and airborne forces well into the 1970s. Approximately 18,000 were produced in total.

History

Previous efforts
Vickers-Armstrongs had been developing guided missiles from the earliest stages of UK research, setting up the Guided Weapons Department at Weybridge (Brooklands) in Surrey. By the mid-1950s had been involved in four projects, all of which were cancelled. The last, the Red Dean/Red Hebe air-to-air missile was so delayed and over designed that the company began to have a bad reputation with the Ministry of Supply, especially with John Clemow. When Red Hebe was cancelled in the aftermath of the 1957 Defence White Paper, the company's guided missile department had no remaining projects.

Unwilling to give up on the missile field, George Edwards led an effort to find a new project that could be undertaken with company funds alone. This led them to the ideas of John Housego and J.E. Daboo for a lightweight anti-tank missile. They were already aware of the British Army's unhappiness with the recently deployed Malkara anti-tank missile. In 1956, Edwards convinced the board to take up development of a replacement for Malkara using a new guidance system developed in-house.

Malkara problems
Malkara was one of the earliest anti-tank missiles, and as such it had a number of issues. Primary among these was the Army's ongoing interest in the use of large high-explosive squash head (HESH) warheads instead of the more common high-explosive anti-tank (HEAT) used by most anti-tank weapons of the era. For any given level of penetration, HESH required much more explosive, and Malarka's need to deal with main battle tanks demanded a  warhead.

Another issue was the guidance system. This consisted of a small joystick that the operator used to guide the missile while visually comparing its position with the target, aided by a bright flare on the missile. When the operator pushed the stick to the right, for instance, it operated the control surfaces to turn the missile to the right. The problem was that the missile would continue moving to the right after the control was released, eventually crossing the line of sight, continuing onto the right side of the target, and requiring left input to stop this motion. This often led to the operator repeatedly overcorrecting the path of the missile, which required significant amounts of training to overcome.

Development begins
Sure that a contract for a Malkara replacement would be forthcoming, Vickers hired John Clemow, their critic, along with Howard Surtees, to head up the new effort. Development began in late 1956 under the model number 891 and given the name Vigilant, for VIsually Guided Infantry Light ANti-Tank missile.

They approached Imperial Chemical Industries (ICI) who developed a lightweight motor with the required performance. In order to reach their desired weight, the missile would have to use a light HEAT warhead. An advanced model had been designed by the Royal Armaments Research and Development Establishment (RARDE) but had not been released to industry, so an off-the-shelf design from the Swiss firm CML was chosen instead.

The guidance system consisted of two parts. One was a single gyroscope that measured the "up" direction, and changed the control outputs so that the correct control fins were actuated no matter what angle the fuselage was compared to the ground. This allowed the missile to spin along its long axis, which was used to even out any asymmetry in the rocket thrust and ensure it flew a relatively straight line. The second part used two gyroscopes that measured the azimuth and altitude motion, referenced to the ground plane of the first gyro.

This was the key to the improved guidance system; when the user input a correction to the right, for instance, when the stick was released the gyros would input the exact opposite control. This resulted in the missile always returning to a line of flight pointed directly out from the operator. To guide the weapon, the operator simply moved it left or right until it visually overlapped the target and then released the control, at which point the weapon would fly itself to the target. The targets could be up to 40 degrees to either size of the launcher.

Another new idea in Vigilant was that the missile was connected by a long wire to the guidance control. This allowed the missile to be set up in any open location while the operator moved to a location with more cover. After launch, the operator would guide the missile into his line of sight and then correct it onto the target. Although the missile left a smoke trail back to the launcher, that was far enough from the operator to offer protection.

Testing
The first examples of the rocket powered fuselage were test fired in September 1958. By this time the original germanium transistors from Texas Instruments were replaced by silicon versions, which were both less expensive and much less sensitive to temperature. Mullard, the UK subsidiary of Philips, also took up production of the same transistors that year. Further improvements the next year allowed all temperature variation to be ignored, removing the need for Zener diodes that had provided this function. Testing also demonstrated that the guidance wires were not strong enough and tended to break, leading to extensive experiments to find a solution. 

Another change was to the form of the controller. This was originally in the form of a "Sten gun" like arrangement that was designed to be fired from the hip during the testing phase, but modified for use while prone for the production version. In testing it was found that the operator would input the incorrect vertical guidance command about 50% of the time, and after some experimentation a new design was used that used a cup-like arrangement that the operated inserted the front of their thumb into while their fingers held a pistol-like grip. In this version, guiding the missile down was accomplished by pulling the controller down, as opposed to pushing forward as on a conventional joystick, and the problem of incorrect guidance immediately fell to only 5%.

By March 1959, thirty-five missiles had been fired in tests. By this time, US interest in replacing their SS.10 missiles was becoming serious, and the US Army intended to make a decision in early 1959. To meet the requirement, Vickers scheduled a series of twenty launches at Weybridge between 9 and 20 March 1959 that would be followed by another five at Fort Benning. It later became obvious that the test equipment at Benning was not really suitable for the tests, so a series of twenty-seven tests was carried out at Redstone instead. Testing at Redstone noted that the flare was too difficult to see at long range in bright sunlight, and a more powerful model was developed.

Official disinterest
While testing in the US was leading to a possible order, the British Army proved not only uninterested, but in some ways, actively hostile. In a 1959 memo, Minute 8, it was stated that "We would not be justified in encouraging the Company to maintain their guided weapon design capacity" and while any number of studies included Vigilant in their discussions, there remained no official plan to buy a light anti-armour weapon of any sort.

This discouragement was due to the ongoing changes to the industry in the aftermath of the 1957 Defence White Paper. Duncan Sandys strongly suggested that future orders for weapons would only be given to larger companies, forcing the merger of smaller firms. Among these was the merger of English Electric and Vickers that would form the nucleus of British Aircraft Corporation (BAC), adding Bristol Aeroplane Company and Hunting Aircraft. EE and Bristol already had their own successful missile design teams, and the government felt there would be no need for a third. Any encouragement to Vickers at this point was seen as a problem if that team would later be broken up and merged into the other two.

To break the logjam, Vickers arranged a 29 September demonstration of the system with 200 officials invited to attend. Eleven missiles were fired for seven hits. It was only at this point that the lingering problems with the wires breaking was clearly on the way to being fully solved, and changes to the simulator system and training regimen were paying off with the average miss from the aim point of only .

The demonstration was a success in terms of starting some official consideration of supporting the project. After some discussion of purchasing a dozen missiles, later enlarged to two dozen, an 11 January 1960 minute encourages this and compares Vigilant to the SS.10, SS.11, ENTAC and German-Swiss Cobra, with the Vigilant being highly competitive with all of these. A 22 April memo represents a setback, reiterating the Minute 8 concerns, followed by a 28 April memo suggesting the Army had not yet decided whether a soldier could effectively operate the system.

By this time, the formation of BAC was well underway. On 30 May, the new director of BACs guided missile programs wrote the War Office and flatly stated that the company would be keeping the Weybridge office open. The memos continued to fly and it was not until 4 August that the War Office finally conceded the point and decided to offer small contracts to keep the effort going. The news was made public on 26 August, the newspapers noted the company has spent nearly £1 million on development and the projected price was only nearly £500 per unit.

On 7 November, a new contract was offered to fill the "firm and urgent requirement" of an anti-tank weapon for the Ferret armoured car, considering ENTAC and Vigilant, which led to an order for seventy additional missile for tests starting 1961. This proved to save the program in the UK; the Vigilant was considered markedly superior to ENTAC due to its guidance system,  By 1961, the Swingfire program was already in its initial stages, and was already considered the ultimate infantry weapon, but Vigilant was now seen as the "interim weapon".

As well as infantry use, Vigilant could be mounted on vehicles such as the Ferret armoured car and Land Rovers. For airborne troops, a lighter polystyrene foam container was developed as well.

Description

Missile
The front half contains the warhead and it's nose probe trigger, the rear half the rocket motor and control system. The warhead is slightly wider in radius than the rear half of the missile, giving the system an overall layout similar to the RPG-7. Four rectangular narrow-chord wings run from just behind the warhead area to just in front of the extreme rear. Each wing carries a control fin at their rear edge. The diameter of the rear section defined by the wings is somewhat larger than the warhead section. The fins were powered by hot gas tapped from the rocket engine.

The control system gyroscopes are placed in front of the rocket engine, just behind the warhead. The transistorized electronics are packaged into two small "fairings" placed between the wings, one for azimuth and one for altitude. These are slightly longer than the wings and serve double duty in connecting the control signals from the wires at the rear of the missile to the gyroscopes. The rocket motor lies near the front of the wings, such that the center of gravity does not change much as the fuel burns off. It consists of a "two stage" system with 2.5 seconds of fast-burning fuel at the rear to boost it to speed, and 10 seconds of slower-burning fuel in front as a sustainer.

At the extreme rear of the missile is a canister containing the outlet pipe for the rocket in the center, and a magnesium flare wrapped around it. An igniter was inserted into the center pipe and ignited both on launch. The control wires were wrapped around the can containing the flare.

The missile reaches its maximum range of 1,375 meters in 12.5 seconds. In testing, the missile's shaped charge warhead penetrated 576 millimeters of armour of 30 to 35 HRC.  Two type of warheads were provided for the Vigilant: a British developed warhead with a collapsible probe that extends on launch which can achieve maximum penetration, and one developed by Swiss firm CML with a blunter nose which has a hardened steel ring which, on oblique strikes, will dig into the armor and swing the shape charge warhead around for better penetration.

System
The missile system could be deployed in a number of configurations. The man-portable configuration consists of a launcher which doubles up as a transport container, a combined sight and controller, a battery and a 63 meter long cable. An optional Missile Selector Box allowed up to 6 missiles to be controlled by, and widely separated from, a single sight controller.

The launcher box is placed on the ground facing the direction of expected targets, and latches on the front and rear of the box are opened. The front cap is rotated downward on a hinge to form a footpad that raises the front of the missile into the air so that it has an initial upward velocity on launch, thereby clearing any local obstructions. The rear cap is removed entirely, it contains the spool holding the cable that attaches to the sighting system or selector box.

The sight controller is a pistol grip design, with two grips. The front grip has the launch trigger, and the rear grip has a thumb joystick for steering the missile. A low-magnification (3.2x) monocular forms the sight itself. Engraved stadia lines allow simple ranging, based on a typical tank target bridging the lines once in range. There is a short delay after pulling the trigger while the gyroscopes are spun up, and then the missile launches at an angle of about 20 degrees above horizontal. After the booster burns out the missile reaches a speed where the control fins become useful, and the missile levels out several meters above the ground and begins the guided stage.

Key to the design was its "velocity control" guidance system. The gyroscopes kept the missile flying level and directly away from the launcher. The operators joystick does not permanently turn the missile as in the Malarka or other contemporary designs like Entac or SS.11. Instead, the control causes the missile to begin flying in the indicated direction, but when the control is release, the autopilot applies the opposite control so that the missile is once again flying directly away from the launcher. This means the operator simply has to adjust the missile until it is seen overlapping the target and then release the controls, at which point it will be flying directly at the target. After that, only minor adjustments are needed to account for accuracy and target motion. Additionally, the gyroscopes automatically correct for any wind buffeting. Vigilant has a reputation for ease of control and high success with minimal operator training.

Operators

Former operators
 
 Abu Dhabi Defence Forces
 United Arab Emirates Army
  Finnish Army
  Kuwait Army
 
  Royal Saudi Land Forces
 
  British Army

References

Citations

Bibliography
 Brassey's Infantry Weapons of the World, J.I.H. Owen
 
 </ref>

External links
 "Vigilant Success Story" a 1960 Flight article

Anti-tank guided missiles of the United Kingdom
Anti-tank guided missiles of the Cold War
Military equipment introduced in the 1960s
Vickers